Makhdoom Nooh Siddiqui, was a Sindhi-language poet and saint He worshipped in the Suharwardi line of style, and was the first to translate the Quran into Persian.

A monument dedicated to him is located in Hala, Sindh, known as Dargah Sarwar e Nooh Siddiqui.

References

1506 births
1590 deaths
Sindhi language
Arab translators
Pakistani translators
Arabic–Persian translators
Quran
Translators of the Quran into Sindhi